Kinassery is a village in Thrissur district of Kerala state, India. It is near Irinjalakuda town

References

Villages in Thrissur district